Junior Strous (born 28 April 1986 in Vlaardingen) is a Dutch racing driver, racing team owner, and entrepreneur from Wassenaar. He has competed at various levels and classes of formula racing starting his professional career in Formula Ford at Geva Racing in 2002, advancing into Formula BMW, Formula Renault, Champcar Atlantic and Indycar Lights.

Early life
Junior Strous was born in the Netherlands in 1986. He is the son of athlete and racecar driver Ton Strous. In 1992, Strous' father and mother, a part-time yoga instructor and businesswoman, started a carwash and detailing business. During a family trip to Tenerife, Spain when Strous was 10 years old, he became interested in racing after his first lap around a track in a go-cart. Since then, Strous had a career during his childhood in karting until he became a professional driver and began testing in Benelux Formula Ford.

Career

Racing career
After testing in Benelux Formula Ford in 2000 and 2001, Strous went on to become the youngest Formula Ford driver to win an international race (Spa-Francorchamps circuit in Belgium) with a B-class car in 2002. Later in 2002, Strous moved up to Formula BMW ADAC.

In 2003, he won the Benelux BMW 325i Cup and Dutch Drifting Cup and competed in  competed in several Formula Renault series in the United States and Europe and finished second in the Benelux championship.

Strous was the Benelux Formula Renault champion in 2004, and later that year, the series' champion of Formula Renault Winter Invitational Championship in Florida. That same year, Strous finished third in the Autovisie Drifting Championship and became a test driver for Toyo Tires.

During the 2005 season, Strous drove in four different Formula Renault series in 2005, finishing 7th in the Eurocup championship (not driving all races), second in the Dutch championship (not driving all races), and he won the UK Winter Series. He also won several races in the 2005-06 Winter Endurance Championship.

In 2006, Strous ventured into touring cars full-time, winning the BMW Compact Cup Benelux and finishing second in the Dacia Logan Cup Netherlands. He competed some races with Jenzer Motorsport in the European Formula Renault Championship and Italian Formula Renault Championship.

In 2007, he competed part-time in the Champ Car Atlantic Championship and finished 14th in points (not driving all races because of a broken wrist).

In 2008, Strous participated full-time in the Atlantic Championship where he tied for fourth place in points at the end of the championship, finished in fifth place, and he won at Circuit Mont-Tremblant for Condor Motorsports.

For 2009, he competed full-time in the Firestone Indy Lights Series with his own team, Winners Circle Group. He won the first two races of the season at Grand Prix of St. Petersburg and led the championship through four rounds. Also in 2009, Strous also won first place at the first race of the Tango Dutch GT4 Championship in Zandvoort. He then came in third in the second round and finished sixth in the third round racing in an Aston Martin V8 Vantage GT4. After the Freedom 100, sponsorship was cut off to Winners Circle group's technical team partner, despite the strong results.

Strous signed on to return to Indy Lights in 2010 with Team Moore Racing. However, less than a month after signing, the team indicated that he had been released from his contract.  Instead, Strous joined the HVM Racing team for the 2010 Indy Lights season.

At the SuperSports Class races in 2011 Strous came in 4th place in the first race, and won the second race.

Crashes and injuries
During the Assen Circuit held in the Netherlands in 2003, Strous crashed after his teammate, Giedo van der Garde accelerated too early on a turn and spun out, hitting Strous' car.

In 2005, Strous was driving for the Osschersleben Circuit in Germany at the Formula Renault 2.0 when his new car crashed and flipped. During a qualifying drive at the Long Beach Circuit for the Champcar Atlantics Series in 2007, Strous crashed, breaking his wrist in the process.

Other activities
Junior Strous is also a drifting specialist, and he founded Winners Circle Group Racing division in 2009. Strous has also participated as a TV commentator for Dutch national racing channel, RaceWorld TV. Strous has also provided commentary for DTM, ChampCar and IndyCar races, and he was sponsored by SLAM!FM, a Dutch radio station, in 2011.

Criminal justice
Strous' family business, a Shell gas station in Wassenaar, was broken into in 2008 and Junior Strous witnessed the crime and pursued the three criminals in a high-speed chase until they spun out of control and drove off the road. The authorities found and arrested one of the individuals and also cited Strous for speeding, but the charges against Strous were later dropped due to the Dutch law (Article 53 of the Code of Criminal Citizens) that allows citizens to pursue criminals when caught in the act.

In 2010, while traveling internationally, Strous noticed security flaws at the Amsterdam Airport Schiphol that would allow travelers to bring in unchecked luggage. Strous reported the discovery to the authorities for further review.  Strous competed in the inaugural Benelux Radical Championship in 2011 coming in first place, winning in the Radical SR3 RS car.

In 2011, Strous assisted a stranger when he extinguished a fire in a car stopped on the road in Wassenaar. He filmed the incident on his phone and posted the video, but it was later removed after the fire department requested it be taken down.

Personal life
Strous spends his spare time traveling and is an art dealer for artist Michiel Molenaar. As of 2014, Strous resides in Lyss, Switzerland.

References

External links
Junior Strous official website
Junior Strous official Twitter
Junior Strous official Facebook
Junior Strous Driver Database

1986 births
Living people
Dutch racing drivers
Atlantic Championship drivers
British Formula Renault 2.0 drivers
Dutch Formula Renault 2.0 drivers
Formula Renault Eurocup drivers
Indy Lights drivers
Italian Formula Renault 2.0 drivers
Nordic Formula Renault 2.0 drivers
North American Formula Renault drivers
Formula BMW ADAC drivers
People from Vlaardingen
People from Lyss
Sportspeople from South Holland
PDM Racing drivers
HVM Racing drivers
Motopark Academy drivers
Van Amersfoort Racing drivers
Jenzer Motorsport drivers
GT4 European Series drivers